Omicron regulum is a diurnal species of neotropical potter wasp, that is found in Central America.

References 

Vespidae